Ševe was a secret police organization of the Ministry of Interior of the Republic of Bosnia and Herzegovina.

History 

Ševe was founded by Alija Delimustafić in May 1992. From the start the unit was led and commanded by Nedžad Ugljen, while its services were used by Asim Dautbašić, Bakir Alispahić, Enver Mujezinović and Fikret Muslimović, Jusuf Jašarević from the Army leadership.

Members 
Ševe was Bosnia's political assassins group made up of former KOS members, special forces members from Niš, as was the case with the Božić brothers, or recruited criminals, among whom was also Nedžad Herenda who was the main executioner of Ševe. They were recruited by Alija Izetbegović's people to eliminate all potential political opposition. "Ševe", were controlled by individuals from the national leadership.

Activities 
Ševe was created as a part of a wider project that has a political, practical and legal segment.

The practical segment implied activities against the "internal enemy". The political segment was expressed through the idea of preserving Bosniaks from being ethnically cleansed.

References

Law enforcement in Bosnia and Herzegovina